The 1931 Green Bay Packers season was their 13th season overall and their 11th in the National Football League. The team finished with a 12–2 record under coach Curly Lambeau, earning them a first-place finish and the Packers' third consecutive National Football League Championship. The Packers became the first team to win three consecutive NFL championships and have since been joined by the 1965-67 Packers.

Schedule

Standings

References

External links
 Green Bay Packers at SportsEncyclopedia.com
 1931 Green Bay Packers at Pro Football Reference

Green Bay Packers seasons
National Football League championship seasons
Green Bay Packers
Green Bay Packers